John Alan Scott (who has published under the names John A. Scott and John Scott) (born 23 April 1948) is an English-Australian poet, novelist and academic.

Biography 
Scott was born in Littlehampton in Sussex, England, migrating to Australia during his childhood and residing mainly in Melbourne since 1959. He attended Monash University, where he was a contemporary of fellow poets Alan Wearne and Laurie Duggan.

A former freelance scriptwriter for radio and television, working on such shows as The Aunty Jack Show (1974), It's Magic (1974) and  The Garry McDonald Show (1977).

He first became known in the literary world as a poet. Throughout the 1970s and 1980s, his work developed in an 'experimental' direction unusual in Australian poetry, owing partly to his interest in translation. In 1985 he was one of Four Australian Poets group that toured the US and Canada reading poetry. He also edited and translated Emmanuel Hocquard : Elegies and Other Works (1989).

Since the 1990s he has concentrated on producing novels. This change was occasioned in part by an Australia Council studio fellowship in Paris which he shared with the Australian novelist Mark Henshaw. His work has won him the Victorian Premier's Award twice, in 1986 and again in 1994. The novel, What I Have Written, has been filmed from his own screenplay and he has been translated into French, German and Slovenian.

He has taught in the Faculty of Creative Arts at Wollongong University but now writes full-time.

Awards
 1984: Newcastle Poetry Prize for St. Clair
 1986: C. J. Dennis Prize for Poetry for St. Clair
 1994: Victorian Premier's Literary Award for What I Have Written
  2013: Peter Porter Poetry Prize for "Four Sonnets"

Bibliography
Poetry
The Barbarous Sideshow (1975)
From the Flooded City (1981)
Smoking (1983)
The Quarrel with Ourselves & Confession (Rigmarole, 1984) 
St. Clair: Three Narratives (UQP, 1986) 
Singles: Shorter Poems, 1982-1986 (1989)
Translation (Picador, 1990) 
Selected Poems (UQP, 1995) 
Shorter Lives (Puncher & Wattman, 2020) 

Novels
Blair (McPhee Gribble, 1988) 
What I Have Written (Penguin, 1994) 
Before I Wake (Penguin, 1996) 
The Architect (Penguin, 2001) 
Warra Warra (Text, 2003) 
N (Brandl & Schlesinger, 2014)

External links
Author page - Australian Literary Resources
Elegy VI by Emmanuel Hocquard, Translation by  John A. Scott from French
Elegy VII by Emmanuel Hocquard, Translation
Interview with John Scott
Bestsellerdoom Review of Warra Warra by Don Anderson

References

1948 births
Australian male novelists
Australian poets
20th-century English novelists
21st-century English novelists
English male poets
Living people
People from Littlehampton
English male novelists
20th-century English male writers
21st-century English male writers
Academic staff of the University of Wollongong
Monash University alumni